|}

The Summer Cup is a Listed National Hunt handicap steeplechase in England which is open to horses aged five years or older. 
It is run at Uttoxeter over a distance of 3 miles, 2 furlongs and 13 yards (3319 metres) and is scheduled to take place each year in late June or early July.

The race was first run in 2000 as the Summer National over a distance of about 4 miles.  The distance was reduced to three and a half miles in 2009.
The race was rebranded as the Summer Cup and reduced further to its current distance in 2012.

Records
Leading jockey (4 wins):
 Noel Fehily – Rheindross (2005), Surface To Air (2008), Fire And Rain (2009), Shuil Royale (2015)

Leading trainer (2 wins):
 Martin Pipe– Stormez (2002), Jurancon II (2003) 
 Peter Bowen -  Take The Stand (2004), McKelvey (2006)
 Emma Lavelle - Fire And Rain (2009), Ouzbeck (2010) Colin Tizzard - Tempestatefloresco (2017), Storm Home (2021) ''

Winners

See also
 Horse racing in Great Britain
 List of British National Hunt races

References 
Racing Post: 
 , 

National Hunt races in Great Britain
Uttoxeter
National Hunt chases
2000 establishments in England
Recurring sporting events established in 2000